The vast majority of Finnish narrow-gauge railways were owned and operated by private companies. There are only a few instances where narrow-gauge railways were in direct connection with each other, and those interchanges did not last for long. The railways never formed a regional rail traffic network, but were only focused on maintaining connections between the national Russian-gauge railway network and the off-line industries.

Some railways were closed due to competition from the roads, others were converted to  Russian gauge.

Common carriers
 The Lovisa–Wesijärvi railway (1900–1960) that operated an  line between Lahti and Loviisa.
 The Hyvinkää–Karkkila railway that operated a  line
 The Jokioinen Railway that operated a  line until 1974, being the last common-carrier narrow-gauge railway in Finland.

Other lines were notably shorter.

Tourist and heritage lines
Narrow-gauge tourist and heritage lines of  gauge and  narrow gauge still operate.
 Jokioinen Museum Railway, 14 km, Jokioinen–Minkio–Humpilla.
 Nykarleby Jernväg, 2 km.
 Tankavaara Kultakylä, opened in 1997.
 Outokummun Kaivosrautatie, 1.15 km, former copper mine.

Other
 Rokua railway, 3.3 km (2.1 mi), line connecting a hotel with a fitness center

References

 
Rail infrastructure in Finland
Finland